The Crop is a 2004 Australian comedy film set during the 1980s.

Plot
The Crop, is set in the early 1980s in Australia, and is about larrikin nightclub owner, Ronnie 'Blade' Gillette (George Elliot), and his barmaid girlfriend Geraldine (Holly Brisley). Two months after random breath testing has been introduced, Blade realises he's going broke. Afraid of driving under the influence, his customers are not buying his grog, they're going out to the carpark to smoke dope.

Like any good businessman, Blade decides he needs a strategy. He decides to grow some dope as a way out of his financial hole. Blade and his best mate, Wack (Rhys Muldoon), set about growing their crop of weed on a property owned by the father of his girlfriend but they soon get caught in a bind between crooked cops and a ruthless moneylender.

Cast

Box office
The Crop received numerous poor reviews.
and only grossed $208,739 (AUD) at the box office in Australia.

Reception
The Crop received the prize for 'Best International Feature Film' at the New York International Film Festival in 2005.

References

External links

The Crop at the National Film and Sound Archive

2004 comedy films
2004 films
Australian comedy films
Australian films about cannabis
2000s English-language films
2000s Australian films